Vermeulen is a Dutch toponymic or occupational surname, meaning "from the (wind/water) mill" (modern Dutch molen). It is a contraction of the surname Van der Meulen. In the Netherlands 20,633 people carried the name in 2007, making it the 30th most common surname, while in Belgium 13,552 people were named Vermeulen in 2008, making it the 11th most common name there.

People with the name Vermeulen, VerMeulen, Vermeule, or Vermeulin include:

Vermeule
Adrian Vermeule (b. 1968), American legal scholar
Blakey Vermeule (b. 1966), American British literature scholar
Emily Vermeule (1928–2001), American classical scholar and archaeologist
Cornelius Clarkson Vermeule I (1859–1950), American civil engineer
Cornelius Clarkson Vermeule II (1895–1943), American WWI soldier and civil engineer
Cornelius Clarkson Vermeule III (1925–2008), American art historian and museum curator
Thomas L. Vermeule (1814–1856), American soldier and politician in California
Vermeulen
Adrian Vermeulen (b. 1990), South African rugby player
Alex Vermeulen (b. 1954), Dutch multimedia artist
Alexey Vermeulen (b. 1994), American racing cyclist
Amy Vermeulen (b. 1983), Canadian football (soccer) forward
André Vermeulen (b. 1955), Belgian journalist and television personality
Andries Vermeulen (1763–1814), Dutch painter
Angelo Vermeulen (b. 1971), Belgian visual artist and scientist
Arjan Vermeulen (b. 1969), Dutch footballer
Benjamin Vermeulen (b. 1957), Belgian racing cyclist
Bo Vermeulen (b. 1999), Fartist, Fake Connoisseur
 (1946–2004), Dutch singer, composer and cabaretier
Chris Vermeulen (b. 1982), Australian motorcycle racer
Cornelis Vermeulen (1644–1708), Flemish Baroque engraver
Demi Vermeulen (b. 1995), Dutch Paralympic equestrian
Duane Vermeulen (b. 1986), South African rugby player
Eddy Vermeulen (="Ever Meulen") (b. 1946), Belgian illustrator and comic strip artist
Edouard Vermeulen (b. 1957), Belgian fashion designer
Elvis Vermeulen (b. 1979), French rugby union player
Éric Vermeulen (b. 1954), French racing cyclist
Erik Vermeulen (b. 1959), Belgian jazz pianist
Esmee Vermeulen (b. 1996), Dutch swimmer
 (1782–1865), Royal Netherlands East Indies Army officer
Franco Vermeulen, South African rugby player
Gidion Vermeulen, South African lawn bowler
Gijs Vermeulen (b. 1981), Dutch rower
Han F. Vermeulen (b. 1952), Dutch historian of anthropology
Hendrik Vermeulen (b. 1982), South African fashion designer
Herman Vermeulen (b.1954), Belgian footballer
Inge Vermeulen (1985–2015), Dutch field hockey player
Jaap J. Vermeulen (b. 1955), Dutch botanist 
Jacques Vermeulen (b. 1995), South African rugby player
Jeff Vermeulen (b. 1988), Dutch racing cyclist
Johannes Vermeulen (1533–1585), also known as Molanus, Flemish Catholic theologian 
 (1941–2009), Flemish author
Jorn Vermeulen (b. 1987), Belgian footballer
Kevin Vermeulen (b. 1990), Dutch footballer
Klaas Vermeulen (b. 1988), Dutch field hockey player
Koert Vermeulen (b. 1967), Belgian lighting designer
 (b. 1985), Dutch footballer
Luc Vermeulen, Flemish nationalist activist
Mark Vermeulen (b. 1979), Zimbabwean cricketer
Matatumua Maimoaga Vermeulen (1935–2012), Samoan politician, nurse and environmentalist
Matthijs Vermeulen (1888–1967), Dutch composer and music journalist
Michael VerMeulen (1956–1995), American magazine editor
 (1846–1913), Dutch politician
Pierre Vermeulen (b. 1956), Dutch football player and coach
PJ Vermeulen (b. 1987), South African rugby player
Riaan Vermeulen (b. 1984), South African rugby player
Robert Vermeulen (b. 1955), American punk rock musician
Roeffie Vermeulen (1906–1963), Dutch Olympic sailor
Robert Vermeulen (="Tesco Vee") (b. 1955), American punk rock musician 
Thijs Vermeulen (b. 1985), Dutch basketball player
Sita Vermeulen (b. 1980), Dutch pop singer
Sjerstin Vermeulen, Dutch swimmer and equestrian
Walter Vermeulen, Samoan / Belgian surgeon, farmer and environmentalist
Waltie Vermeulen (b. 1988), South African rugby union player
William VerMeulen, American French horn player
Vermeulin
Michel Vermeulin (b. 1934), French racing cyclist

See also
Van der Meulen
Matthijs Vermeulen Award, named after the Dutch composer
Vermeulenia, a genus of orchids named after the Dutch botanist Pieter Vermeulen (1899–1981)

References

Surnames of Belgian origin
Dutch-language surnames
Afrikaans-language surnames